The Mazon River or Mazon Creek, is a tributary of the Illinois River in the United States. The confluence is near Morris, Illinois.

The Mazon River is associated with the Mazon Creek fossils of the Francis Creek Shale, which are also exposed in strip mines and quarries near the River. This fossil bed includes well-preserved fossils from the Pennsylvanian period of the Paleozoic era and is a world-famous Lagerstätten site.

The river was named in honor of William Mason, a pioneer settler.

Cities and counties
The following cities, towns and villages are within the Mazon watershed:
Braidwood
Coal City
Dwight
Gardner
Mazon
Morris

The following counties are at least partly drained by the Mazon River:
Grundy County
Kankakee County
Livingston County
Will County

See also
List of Illinois rivers

References

External links
American Whitewater
Prairie State Canoeists
Field Museum Collection, Mazon Creek Fossils
Illinois State Museum, Mazon Creek Fossil Collection
Prairie Rivers Network
USGS Real-time Stream Gage Mazon River
Upper Illinois/Mazon River watershed map (PDF)

Tributaries of the Illinois River
Rivers of Illinois
Rivers of Grundy County, Illinois
Rivers of Kankakee County, Illinois
Rivers of Livingston County, Illinois
Rivers of Will County, Illinois